Shaik Mastan Vali is an Indian politician belonging to Indian National Congress. He was a Member of Legislative Assembly from Guntur East, Andhra Pradesh. Since 16 April 2018, he is Secretary for All India Congress Committee.

Career
Mastan Vali was made City Congress party president in 2008. He was elected as an MLA in 2009 from Guntur East constituency.

Previous Position Held

 2009 Elected Member Of Legislative Assembly Guntur East Constuiency 
 2011- 2013  Chairman, Committee on Welfare of Minorities,  Andhra Pradesh Legislative Assembly

References

People from Guntur district
Indian National Congress politicians from Andhra Pradesh
Living people
Year of birth missing (living people)